(English: Most Quarter) is the southwestern quarter of the four quarters of Lower Austria (the northeast state of the 9 states in Austria). It is bordered on the north by the Danube and to the south and west by the state borders of Styria and Upper Austria respectively. The  forms the natural border to the east and gives the quarter its second name, "The Quarter over the ".

The name  comes from the term , which refers to the perry and cider made in the region. The lands between the Rivers  and  enjoy favorable conditions for growing fruit trees and are therefore the heart of a flourishing most industry. The Perry tree blossom in April is a regular highlight of the region.

Business and Industry

Economy
However, most of the economy is made up of small and mid-sized companies.

Most
In the  region, Most (a type of perry or cider) is considered to be of great cultural importance and is seen as an identifying characteristic of the region.   is frequently consumed in  together with local foods and pastries, and it is also made into schnaps. While the term  can also be used to refer to grape must, in the  region it refers to the local perry and cider.

Geography
The  is made up of the following districts:

 
 
 
  south of the Danube
 
  south of the Danube 

References

External links

 
 

Geography of Lower Austria